Jimmy Wilde (1892–1969) was a Welsh professional boxer and world boxing champion.

Jimmy Wilde may also refer to:

 Jimmy Wilde (footballer, fl. 1914–23), English footballer for Burnley, Reading and Accrington Stanley	
 Jimmy Wilde (footballer, born 1904) (1904–1976), English footballer for Crystal Palace
 Jimmy Wilde, one of the many pen names of John Creasey (1908–1973), English crime and science fiction writer

See also
 James Wilde (disambiguation)